Muhammad Ali and Jimmy Young fought a boxing match on April 30, 1976. Ali won the bout through a unanimous decision on points. This bout was aired live in primetime on ABC with Howard Cosell calling the action from the Capital Centre in Landover, Maryland.
Desicion was unanimous:70-68Ali/72-65Ali/71-64Ali

Background 
Prior to the bout, Muhammad Ali's trainer Angelo Dundee put up a message board to Ali saying "Remember San Diego" That was when Ali, overweight, lost a 12-round split decision to Ken Norton on March 31, 1973 in that city, knowing just before this bout Ali trained lightly.

Ali came into the bout at 230 pounds, the heaviest he's ever been for any fight until 1981 when he weighted 236 pounds in a bout with Trevor Berbick.

Fight 
The fight was a hard fought defense for Ali, who found himself struggling against the crafty challenger. Young’s footwork and defensive skills made him stylistically difficult for Ali, and for most of the fight he did well against the champion.

During the bout on six occasions, Young ducked outside of the ropes when he began to be seriously pressured by Ali. He did it in the seventh round, the eighth, the 12th, twice in the 13th and once more in the 15th. When he did it in the 12th round, the referee ruled it a knockdown and began to count. Young pulled his head back into the ring at the count of two. Young’s decision to duck outside of the ring did not go over well with the judges, costing him points, and was one of the chief factors in his loss.

When the decision was made, the crowd loudly booed. Ali won by decision with  the three judges voting for him.

In the stats department, Young landed 222 punches to Ali's 113. Young outlanded Ali 65-27 in jabs and 187-86 in power punches. The punch disparity highlighted the booing at the judges decisions. Compubox points out that Young landed 41.1 percent while Ali only 18.9 percent of the shots. Ali's 113 punches we're the lowest Ali ever had in a 15-round bout.

Post-fight Quotes
"He look pitiful. I kept hollering up to him. 'don't blow the money, Ali, don't blow the money damn it!' But the Ali you saw tonight is not the guy I have to fight. I wish I was, but it won't be. He'll be ready for me. You can count on it" - Ken Norton

References

Young
1976 in boxing
World Boxing Association heavyweight championship matches
World Boxing Council heavyweight championship matches
April 1976 sports events in the United States
Boxing in Maryland
1976 in sports in Maryland